The Rose in Splendour: A Story of the Wars of Lancaster and York is an historical novel by Leslie Barringer. It was first published by Phoenix House  in 1953.

Plot
The novel is set in England over a period of eighteen months in the years 1460-61 during the internal war generally known as the Wars of the Roses between the House of Lancaster and the House of York. It tells the tale of a young boy's early life, leaving his family’s farm first to an apprenticeship in York and later getting caught up in the bloody and decisive victory for the Yorkists at the Battle of Towton (29 March (Palm Sunday) 1461).

References 

1953 British novels
British historical novels
Novels set in the 1460s
Novels set in Yorkshire
Wars of the Roses in fiction